St Mary's Sporting Club Inc., nicknamed the Saints, is an Australian rules football and netball club based in the port city of Geelong, Victoria. The club teams currently compete in the Geelong Football Netball League, the premier league in the region.

History

Earlier club
A version of this club existed from 1904 to 1906. They competed in the Church Union Association and won the 1905 Church Union Association premiership.
The club was short-lived, disbanding in 1906, and it was another 16 years before St Mary's re-formed. This was done with great success playing in the Geelong Athletics Societies Football Association. It won flags in 1922, 1923, 1924 and 1927 before disbanding again in 1934.

Current club
The club was reformed from the merger of CYMS and YCW Clubs in 1953. They joined the GDFL Evelyn Hurst Cup and won their first flag in 1956. Since then it has become one of the most consistently successful club in the league.  It was part of the breakaway that created the Geelong Football League in 1979.

Premierships
Geelong Football League
1979, 1992, 2004, 2008, 2019
Geelong & District Football League
1956, 1959, 1960, 1967, 1972, 1975
AFL Barwon Women's Football
2019 (Division 1)

Notable players 
David Armour – 
Nick Brushfield – 
Jack Condon – 
Peter Zychla - 
Scott Hosking - Geelong
Jack Henry - 
Oliver Henry - 
Tom McFarlane  - St Mary's Sporting Club (U16's Division 6 Red Onion Cup)
Tooth Jones (Formerly Mitch Harrison)  - St Mary's Sporting Club (2009 Under 14 Div 5 Kerr's Northside Hire Cup)

Bibliography
 Cat Country: History of Football In The Geelong Region – John Stoward –

References

External links

 Official website

Geelong Football League clubs
1953 establishments in Australia
Geelong & District Football League clubs
Sports clubs established in 1953
Australian rules football clubs established in 1953
Netball teams in Geelong
Australian rules football clubs in Geelong